Sally Jane Janet Gunnell  (born 29 July 1966) is a British former track and field athlete, active between 1984 and 1997, who won the 1992 Olympic gold medal in the 400 metres hurdles. During a golden 24-month period between 1992 and 1994, Gunnell won every international event open to her, claiming Olympic Games, World Championship, European Championship, Commonwealth Games, Goodwill Games, IAAF World Cup and European Cup golds in the event, and breaking the British, European and World records in it. She is the only female British athlete to have won all four 'majors'; Olympic, World, European and Commonwealth titles, and was the first female 400 metres hurdler in history to win the Olympic and World titles and break the world record. Her former world record time of 52.74 secs in 1993, still ranks in the world all-time top ten (as of 2022) and is the current British record. She was named World and European Female Athlete of the Year in 1993, and was made an MBE in 1993 and an OBE in 1998.

Early life
Gunnell was born in Chigwell, Essex, England to Les and Rosemary Gunnell, and grew up on the family's three-hundred-acre farm and attended the local primary and West Hatch High schools in Chigwell.

Athletics career
Gunnell started out in athletics with the Essex Ladies club as an accomplished long jumper and heptathlete, before specialising in hurdling. In 1984, she narrowly missed Olympic selection at both heptathlon, with a score of 5680 points and in the 100 metres hurdles, where she set a UK junior record of 13.30 secs.

In 1986, having won the AAAs and UK titles, Gunnell won the Commonwealth Games gold medal in the 100 metres hurdles in Edinburgh, ahead of Wendy Jeal and 1984 Olympic heptathlon champion Glynis Nunn. She would remain the UK number one in the event over the next four seasons and reach the semi-finals at the 1987 World Championships and 1988 Olympics in the event.

Gunnell first attempted the 400 m hurdles event in 1987, with a 59.9 clocking. In 1988, in her first full season at the event, she would reach the Olympic final in Seoul. At the Olympic trials in Birmingham, she broke the UK record with 55.40. In Seoul she would improve this twice, first to 54.48 in the semis then to 54.03, to finish fifth in the final. This would remain her best time in the event for three years.

In 1989, Gunnell won the European Indoor title at 400 metres. Outdoors, she finished second in the 400 m hurdles at the European Cup behind East Germany's Petra Krug, but ahead of Olympic silver medallist Tatyana Ledovskaya. In September at the World Cup, she was third behind Sandra Farmer-Patrick of the US and Ledovsakya, but this time ahead of Krug. In January 1990, she defeated 1988 Olympic champion Debbie Flintoff-King to win the Commonwealth title in Auckland. The 1990 summer season however was disappointing, when she only finished sixth at the European Championships.

Gunnell entered into the best phase of her career in 1991, improving her own three-year-old UK record three times. In Monaco she ran 53.78, in Zurich she ran 53.62, then at the World Championships in Tokyo, she won the silver medal behind Ledovskaya with 53.16, the then third fastest time of all-time. Ledovskaya won with 53.11.

Gunnell won the 400 m hurdles at the 1992 Olympic Games in Barcelona, running 53.23 to defeat Sandra Farmer-Patrick. She also anchored the British 4 × 400 m quartet to a bronze medal. In 1993, she reached her peak, when she set the world record in the 400 hurdles to win gold in the World Championships in Stuttgart, winning in 52.74, narrowly ahead of Farmer-Patrick who ran 52.79, also inside the old record.
This record was broken by Kim Batten in 1995, but is still the British record. Gunnell was the first female 400 metres hurdler to have won the Olympic and World titles and broken the world record, a feat since achieved by both Dalilah Muhammad and Sydney McLaughlin.

In 1994, Gunnell added the European title to her collection, winning comfortably in 53.33. She also won the Goodwill Games ahead of Kim Batten, successfully defended her Commonwealth title and won the World Cup title in London. 1994 was her third (and final) year as the world's number one. She missed most of 1995 due to injury, an injury from which she would never fully recover. Her defence of her Olympic title in Atlanta in 1996 was cut short when she pulled up injured in the semi-finals. This seemed a particularly cruel blow, as this race occurred on her 30th birthday. Also in 1996, she worked as a Red Cross ambassador in Angola. In September 1997, she retired after a recurrence of an Achilles tendon injury forced her to pull out of the World Championships semi-final.

Gunnell remains the only woman to have won the European, World, Commonwealth and Olympic 400-metre hurdles titles.

Gunnell is now involved as one of the ambassadors for McCain's Track & Field partnership with UK Athletics.

Television
Gunnell worked as a television presenter, predominantly for the BBC, until 2006. She also co-hosted the game show Body Heat (1994–96) on ITV with Mike Smith and Jeremy Guscott.

Gunnell was one of the four celebrity guests in the ITV's You Bet! – Series 7 (1993–94), co-winning with Michaela Strachan, donating her winnings to a charity working to find a cure for breast cancer. In 1997, she was the recipient of the "big red book" on the This is Your Life programme.

In summer 2006, she was a celebrity showjumper in the BBC's Sport Relief event Only Fools on Horses. She also won a Weakest Link Sporting Heroes Special, first broadcast on 25 July 2009 on BBC One.

She took part in a celebrity version of TV show Total Wipeout which aired on 2 January 2010.

In 2012, Gunnell took part on ITV's The Cube and won £20,000 for her charity.

Recognition
In the 1993 New Year Honours, Gunnell was made an MBE (Member of the Order of the British Empire) and in the 1998 Queen's Birthday Honours, she was made an OBE (Officer of the Order of the British Empire). In 2011, Gunnell was appointed Deputy Lieutenant of West Sussex.

In 2012, Sally was one of five Olympians chosen as part of a series body-casting artworks by Louise Giblin exhibited in London and copies being sold in aid of the charity Headfirst.

Personal life
Gunnell is married to fellow athlete Jonathan Bigg, and has three sons; Finley, Luca and Marley. She lives in Steyning, in West Sussex, just outside Brighton.

National titles
7-times AAAs 100 m hurdles champion (1986–1989, 1991–1993)
2-time AAAs 400 m hurdles champion (1988, 1996)
2-time UK Champion – 100 m hurdles (1986) 400 m hurdles (1997)
2-time AAAs Indoor Champion –  200 m (1987) 400 m (1988)

International competitions

Note: Represented Great Britain in all events excluding the Commonwealth Games, where she represented England and the 1989 World Cup, where she represented Europe.

References

External links
 Sally Gunnell Official Website
 

1966 births
Living people
Sportspeople from Essex
People from Chigwell
People from Steyning
English female hurdlers
British female hurdlers
English female sprinters
British female sprinters
English television presenters
British sports broadcasters
Olympic athletes of Great Britain
Olympic gold medallists for Great Britain
Olympic bronze medallists for Great Britain
Olympic gold medalists in athletics (track and field)
Olympic bronze medalists in athletics (track and field)
Athletes (track and field) at the 1988 Summer Olympics
Athletes (track and field) at the 1992 Summer Olympics
Athletes (track and field) at the 1996 Summer Olympics
Medalists at the 1992 Summer Olympics
English Olympic medallists
Commonwealth Games gold medallists for England
Commonwealth Games silver medallists for England
Commonwealth Games medallists in athletics
Athletes (track and field) at the 1986 Commonwealth Games
Athletes (track and field) at the 1990 Commonwealth Games
Athletes (track and field) at the 1994 Commonwealth Games
Goodwill Games medalists in athletics
World Athletics Championships athletes for Great Britain
World Athletics Championships medalists
European Athletics Championships medalists
Deputy Lieutenants of West Sussex
Officers of the Order of the British Empire
European Athlete of the Year winners
The Sunday Times Sportswoman of the Year winners
World Athletics Championships winners
Competitors at the 1994 Goodwill Games
Medallists at the 1986 Commonwealth Games
Medallists at the 1990 Commonwealth Games
Medallists at the 1994 Commonwealth Games